Barygenys is a genus of microhylid frogs. They are endemic to New Guinea and the adjacent Louisiade Archipelago. So far only known from Papua New Guinea, the range of the genus is expected to reach Papua province in the Indonesian part of New Guinea. Despite not being known from Papua, common name Papua frogs has been suggested for them.

Description
Barygenys have squat body, narrow head, and tiny eyes. Barygenys are unique among asterophryine frogs in that they bear vertical ridges (or traces thereof) on the snout, and in having short, sharply tapering fingers with narrowly rounded tips.

Ecology
Barygenys are burrowing frogs. They tend to have spotty distributions and are rarely collected, and consequently poorly known.

Species
As of early 2017, nine species are recognized:

References

 
Microhylidae
Amphibian genera
Amphibians of Oceania
Amphibians of New Guinea
Taxa named by Hampton Wildman Parker
Endemic fauna of New Guinea